Limestone Generating Station is a run-of-the-river hydroelectric dam on the Nelson River approximately  north of Winnipeg near  Gillam, Manitoba. Part of the Nelson River Hydroelectric Project, Limestone was Manitoba Hydro's fifth and largest generating station to be built on the Nelson River. The station was built on the Nelson River at  Long Spruce Rapids.

The dam is owned and operated by Manitoba Hydro. It has ten generating units with a capacity of 1,330 megawatts and annual generation around 8.5 terawatt-hours. Although work at the site began in 1976 with a cofferdam completed in 1978, construction was suspended owing to a slowing of demand for electric power. The project resumed in 1985, with the first generating unit delivering power in 1990 and completion in 1992. Construction cost was $CDN 1.43 billion; favorable economic conditions at the time resulted in lower cost than budget.

See also
 List of largest power stations in Canada
 Kettle Generating Station – first dam upstream, completed in 1973 
 Long Spruce Generating Station – second dam upstream, completed in 1979
 Nelson River DC Transmission System – transmission system to loads in the South of the province

References

External links

Energy infrastructure completed in 1992
Hydroelectric power stations in Manitoba
Run-of-the-river power stations